Agua Santa Airport,  is an airport serving Palmilla, a town in the O'Higgins Region of Chile.

See also

Transport in Chile
List of airports in Chile

References

External links
OpenStreetMap - Agua Santa
OurAirports - Agua Santa
FallingRain - Agua Santa Airport

Airports in O'Higgins Region